Sparwood is a district municipality in the Canadian province of British Columbia. It is the second-largest community on the Elk River.

Located approximately 30 kilometres from Fernie, the District Municipality of Sparwood has approximately 4,200 residents. Sparwood is quite large for its population, taking up an area of 191.01 square kilometres and incorporating the local coal mines.

In the late 1800s, there was a railroad stop known as Sparwood, which was so named because of the trees from this area being shipped to the coast for manufacturing spars for ocean vessels.

Economy
The local economy is heavily dependent on steel-making coal mining, one of British Columbia's primary industries. A large part of the population either works in the mines or as tradespeople and labourers in related support industries, such as trucking or as mechanics. Logging is another important industry.

Sparwood/Elk Valley Airport is the local airport for general aviation. The closest airport with commercial service is Cranbrook/Canadian Rockies International Airport. Road access is provided by the Crowsnest Highway.

Sparwood was formed on 12 May 1966 accepting people from the nearby towns of Michel, Natal, and Middletown (an urban renewal). Since the beginning of Sparwood, it has experienced many ups and downs in coal mining, the town's primary industry.

Attractions

Sparwood promotes itself extensively as the home of the Terex Titan, at one time the largest truck in the world. The green Titan, in service at Sparwood between 1978 and 1991, stands a few yards from the Crowsnest Highway where it can attract the attention of tourists and travellers. The adjacent tourist information centre serves visitors to the district municipality and the wider area.

Sparwood is distinguished by mural art which depicts something of the history of the former Michel-Natal mining communities.

Sports

Sparwood is home to the 2011 B.C. provincial champion boys snowboarding team. Sparwood is also home to the 2011 Junior Boys and 2012 Junior Girls Provincial Bowling champions.

Laurie Hockridge of Sparwood and Lethbridge College, is a CCAA-ACSC Hall of Fame inductee (WBB, '87–90). Her legacy includes back-to-back national championships and two national championship MVP trophies.

Fernie Memorial Arena disaster
On 17 October 2017 an ammonia leak at the Fernie Memorial Arena killed three workers (two City of Fernie employees and one CIMCO refrigeration employee from Calgary) during the Fernie Ghostriders' regular season. Because of this tragedy, the City of Fernie declared a state of emergency and people had to evacuate the area for days. The 'Riders were relocated because of this to the Elk Valley Leisure Centre in Sparwood during the 2017–18 KIJHL season until the City of Fernie installed a new chiller unit. The Ghostriders now play at their home rink again.

Demographics

Ethnicity

Religion 
According to the 2021 census, religious groups in Sparwood included:
Irreligion (2,405 persons or 58.0%)
Christianity (1,695 persons or 40.8%)
Islam (15 persons or 0.4%)

Education
There are two public schools in Sparwood; Frank J Mitchell which is an Elementary School and the new Sparwood Secondary School.
These schools are operated by School District 5 Southeast Kootenay which is based in Cranbrook.

Climate
Sparwood has a warm-summer humid continental climate (Köppen Dfb) with relatively cold and very snowy winters combined with moderately warm summers with relatively high diurnal temperature variation. As a result of the low overnight lows in summer, September's mean of  places Sparwood just above subarctic climates (Dfc) in classification.

Local media

Newspapers

 Fernie Free Press – Weekly Paper
 Kootenay News Advertiser – Weekly Paper
 Fernie Fix – Monthly Glossy Magazine

Radio stations
 99.1 FM – CJDR, a rebroadcaster of CHDR-FM, Rock
 92.7 FM – CFBZ, a rebroadcaster of CHBZ-FM, Country
 97.7 FM – CBTN, a rebroadcaster of CBTK-FM, CBC
 107.9 FM – CFSM-FM – Adult Contemporary

Cable television stations
 Channel 10:  Shaw TV
 Channel 5:  CFCN, CTV
 Channel 13:  CBUT, CBC

Notable people
The following people were born in Sparwood:

Daryl Boyle (born 1987), professional ice hockey player
Michelle Loughery (born 1961), muralist
Niki Sharma, politician

Sister cities
Since 1980, Sparwood has been the sister city of Kamisunagawa in Hokkaido, Japan.

See also
Fernie Ghostriders
Elk River
Elk Valley
Kootenay Ice
Regional District of East Kootenay#Municipalities

Notes

References

External links

District municipalities in British Columbia
Mining communities in British Columbia
Elk Valley (British Columbia)
Regional District of East Kootenay